Music and sleep involves the listening of music in order to improve sleep quality or improve sleep onset insomnia in adults (for infant use of music and sleep, see lullaby). This process can be either self-prescribed or under the guidance of a music therapist. Music is easy to administer and has no reported side effects. Music can be combined with relaxation techniques such as breathing exercises and progressive muscle relaxation. Research suggests that prevalence of music as a sleep aid may be up to 25% in the general population.

Major empirical findings 
Research indicates that music may improve subjective sleep quality in adults with sleep problems. However, findings are less consistent with improving sleep quality of 'normal' sleepers. In direct comparisons, music has improved sleep quality greater than audiobooks and has been comparable to sedative hypnotics. One review of non-pharmacological sleep aids identified music as the only sleep aid with adequate research.

Mechanisms

Dickson & Schubert's RPR 
Dickson & Schubert summarized and evaluated six researcher proposed reasons (RPR) by which music could potentially aid sleep:

 Entrainment: 'synchronization of biological rhythms to beat structures in music.'
 Masking: 'obscuring noxious background noise with music.'
 Enjoyment: 'listening to preferred, emotionally relatable or pleasant music.'
 Distraction: 'where music acts as a focal point to distract from inner stressful thoughts.'
 Expectation: 'individuals cultural beliefs around music.'
 Relaxation: 'where music encourages physiological or psychological relaxation.'

Habit formation 
Dickson & Schubert proposed Habit Formation as an additional RPR under the Arts on Prescription model. Music requires a minimum of three weeks for individuals suffering mild insomnia to become healthy sleepers and continues to improve sleep quality over three months. Music improved sleep quality with increased exposure regardless of differences in the demographic, music genre, duration of treatment, and exposure frequency.
Dickson suggests to "listen to music that you find relaxing, at the same time, every night for at least three weeks".

Musical genres and features 
Typical genres of music used for sleep (sedative music) include classical music, ethnic music, ambient music, meditation music and lullabies. Although researchers have recognised a wide diversity of music genres aiding sleep.  The characteristics of music that have improved sleep quality in the music-sleep literature include slow tempo, small change of rhythm, and moderate pitch variation of melody. The selection of music (self selected or researcher selected) does not appear to impact sleep quality.

Sedative music developed in collaboration with researchers 
 Can't Sleep (app) - Gaelen Thomas Dickson (music psychology)
 Pzizz (app) - Maryanne Garry (psychology)
 Marconi Union - Weightless (song) - Lyz Cooper (sound therapy)
 Max Richter - Sleep (album) - David Eagleman (neuroscience)

See also 
 Long Ambients 1: Calm. Sleep.
 Lullaby
 Music psychology
 Music therapy
 Sleep (album)

References 

Musicology
Music therapy
Music psychology
Sleep